= Military operations other than war (Japan) =

Japanese military operations other than war (MOOTW) focus on deterring war, resolving conflict, promoting peace, and supporting civil authorities in response to domestic crises.

The military in Japan is affected by Japan's pacifist post-war constitution. The initial decision to participate in UN peacekeeping missions was not uncontroversial, and its continuing role in international affairs continues to be qualified.

== Select Japanese deployments ==
- Anti-piracy operations, 2009–Present: Maritime Self-Defense Forces, 8 flotillas have patrolled coastal waters near Somalia.
- Iraq War ("Operation Enduring Freedom"), 2003-2009: Ground Self-Defense Forces, water purification near Basra; Air Self-Defense Forces, cargo and personnel transport; Maritime Self-Defense Forces, supply ships servicing the international flotilla .
